Phaeobacter piscinae is a heterotrophic, antimicrobial and motile bacteria from the genus of Phaeobacter. Phaeobacter piscinae produces tropodithietic acid.

References 

Rhodobacteraceae
Bacteria described in 2017